Lane End is a 1972 Australian TV series. It is a follow up to Bellbird, made by many of the same creative team. It is set in Paddington, New South Wales and told the continuing story of a group of characters who worked and lived there.

Regular characters included a Greek-Australian and his wife (Mr and Mrs Pappas) who ran the corner store; their daughter, Angela, who was a first year Arts student at University and battled with problems of conflict with her traditional parents; a man who owned a used-car lot (Ray Dunlop, played by John Meillon); a young man who was an accountant by day and a jazz pianist at night; and a nursing sister (who was added to the show so she could move around Paddington during the daytime when most workers would be at their desks or place of employment). 
The serial did not continue beyond the originally commissioned batch of seven half-hour episodes.

Cast
Margaret Christensen
Lyndall Barbour
Ben Gabriel
Carole Skinner
John Meillon
Rosalba Verucci
Clare Balmford
Fred Betts
Lea Denfield
Paul Glyn

References

External links
Lane End at IMDb
Lane End at Aussie Soap Archive
Lane End at Austlit

Australian drama television series
1972 Australian television series debuts
English-language television shows